Henryk Julian Gołębiewski (born 15 June 1956) is a Polish actor. He is best known for his role in the film Edi (2002), for which he received a Polish Academy Award for Best Actor nomination.

External links
 
 Profile on filmpolski.pl 

1956 births
Living people
Polish male film actors
Male actors from Warsaw
Polish male child actors